United States Telecom Association v. Federal Communications Commission may refer to:

 United States Telecom Association v. FCC (2004), a 2004 United States Court of Appeals for the District of Columbia case

 United States Telecom Association v. FCC (2016), a 2014 United States Court of Appeals for the District of Columbia case